General elections were held in San Marino on 14 August 1955. Although the Sammarinese Christian Democratic Party remained the largest party, winning 23 of the 60 seats in the Grand and General Council, the alliance of the Sammarinese Communist Party and Sammarinese Socialist Party retained its majority.

Electoral system
Voters had to be citizens of San Marino, male and at least 24 years old.

Results

References

San Marino
General elections in San Marino
General
San Marino